Albert Ernst Anton Becker (13 June 1834 – 10 January 1899) was a German composer and conductor of the Romantic period.

Becker was born in Quedlinburg.  In 1853–1856 he studied music composition under Siegfried Dehn in Berlin. He taught on the faculty of the Akademie der Künste where his famous pupils included Johan Halvorsen and Jean Sibelius. In 1889 he was appointed conductor of the Royal cathedral choir in Berlin. He was the grandfather of composer Günter Raphael.  He died in Berlin.

External links

1834 births
1899 deaths
19th-century German composers
19th-century conductors (music)
German conductors (music)
German male conductors (music)
German male composers
Pupils of Siegfried Dehn